Tonna tenebrosa is a species of large sea snail, a marine gastropod mollusk in the family Tonnidae, the tun shells.

Description

Distribution

References

External links

Tonnidae
Gastropods described in 1860
Taxa named by Sylvanus Charles Thorp Hanley